Shukriya or Shukria is an Arabic name for females meaning "thankful". It is the feminine active participle of the Arabic verb, شَكَرَ, meaning "to be thankful". The masculine form of the name is Shukri, alternatively Shoukri, Shoukry, Shokri, Choukri, Choucri, Chokri etc., or Şükrü in Turkish. It can be used as either a given name or surname. It is also a word that in the Urdu language (Urdu: شکریہ) means "Thank You".

People with the given name
Shukria Asil, Afghan women's rights activist
Shukria Barakzai, Afghan politician, journalist and feminist

See also
Shukriya (disambiguation)
Shukria clan, a large clan of Arab nomads